Lodygino is a rural locality (a village) in Pavlovskoye Rural Settlement of Kargopolsky District, Arkhangelsk Oblast, Russia. The population was 16 as of 2010.

Geography 
Lodygino is located 12 km east of Kargopol (the district's administrative centre) by road. Kazakovo is the nearest rural locality.

References 

Rural localities in Kargopolsky District